Sepedonophilus hodites is a species of centipede in the Geophilidae family. It is endemic to Australia, and was first described in 1940 by American biologist Ralph Vary Chamberlin.

Description
The original description of this species is based on a male specimen measuring 18 mm in length with 49 pairs of legs.

Distribution
The species occurs in most Australian states. It has also been recorded in Hawaii as an adventive species, though is probably not established there.

Behaviour
The centipedes are solitary terrestrial predators that inhabit plant litter, soil and rotting wood.

References

 

 
hodites
Centipedes of Australia
Endemic fauna of Australia
Animals described in 1940
Taxa named by Ralph Vary Chamberlin